Omorgus costatus is a species of beetle of the family Trogidae that occurs in Australia, Tasmania, the Solomon Islands, New Guinea, Vietnam, Java, India, and China.

References 

costatus
Beetles of Australia
Taxa named by Christian Rudolph Wilhelm Wiedemann
Beetles described in 1823